Monomorium ergatogyna is a species of ant in the family Formicidae. This species is often mistaken for Monomorium minimum as they are similar in appearance. This ant is a shiny black color and contains only a single worker caste, making them a monomorphic species. It is also polygyne, meaning a colony contains multiple fertile queens living together. They are native to California, Nevada, and Utah and are usually found in cities or on the coast (in California also being found on islands near the coast). When compared to other Monomorium species, they are found to have the longest living queens and can live up 2 years in captivity. Argentine ants (Linepithema humile) have been discovered to be actively pushing this species out of its original territory. 

Some speculation as to the difference between the island species and the coastal mainland species in California has been brought up. A few argue that the mainland species aren't actually ergatogyna but a different species or subspecies, they point to the size difference of island queens and mainland queens. Another point is that mainland species appear to be allopatric, but more evidence must be brought forward to prove this point.

References

Further reading

External links

 

Monomorium
Articles created by Qbugbot
Insects described in 1904